Avogadro is an ancient lunar impact crater that is located in the northern hemisphere on the far side of the Moon. The formation has been heavily worn and eroded by subsequent impacts, so that the rim is now little more than a rounded edge surrounding the crater depression. The crater floor is equally worn, being covered in a multitude of smaller craters of various sizes. Many of these smaller craters have also been eroded, leaving little more than a faint trace on the surface.

Nearby craters of note include Tikhov, which is nearly attached to the southeast rim, Oberth to the west, and Schjellerup to the north-northwest. To the south-southwest is the crater Yamamoto, and farther to the south is the large walled plain D'Alembert.

Satellite craters
By convention these features are identified on lunar maps by placing the letter on the side of the crater midpoint that is closest to Avogadro.

References

External links
 

Impact craters on the Moon